Gusselby is a locality situated in Lindesberg Municipality, Örebro County, Sweden with 300 inhabitants in 2010.

References

External links 
 Om Gusselby

Populated places in Örebro County
Populated places in Lindesberg Municipality